The umbilical artery is a paired artery (with one for each half of the body) that is found in the abdominal and pelvic regions.  In the fetus, it extends into the umbilical cord.

Structure

Development
The umbilical arteries supply deoxygenated blood from the fetus to the placenta. Although this blood is typically referred to as deoxygenated, this blood is fetal systemic arterial blood and will have the same amount of oxygen and nutrients as blood distributed to the other fetal tissues. There are usually two umbilical arteries present together with one umbilical vein in the umbilical cord. The umbilical arteries surround the urinary bladder and then carry all the deoxygenated blood out of the fetus through the umbilical cord. Inside the placenta, the umbilical arteries connect with each other at a distance of approximately 5 mm from the cord insertion in what is called the Hyrtl anastomosis. Subsequently, they branch into chorionic arteries or intraplacental fetal arteries.

The umbilical arteries are actually the latter of the internal iliac arteries (anterior division of). These supply the hind limbs with blood and nutrients in the fetus.

The umbilical arteries are one of two arteries in the human body, that carry deoxygenated blood, the other being the pulmonary arteries.

The pressure inside the umbilical artery is approximately 50 mmHg. Resistance to blood flow decreases during development as the artery grows wider.

After development
The umbilical artery regresses after birth. A portion obliterates to become the medial umbilical ligament (not to be confused with the median umbilical ligament, a different structure that represents the remnant of the embryonic urachus). A portion remains open as a branch of the anterior division of the internal iliac artery.  The umbilical artery is found in the pelvis, and gives rise to the superior vesical arteries.  In males, it may also give rise to the artery to the ductus deferens which can be supplied by the inferior vesical artery in some individuals.

Clinical significance 
A catheter may be inserted into one of the umbilical arteries of critically ill babies for drawing blood for testing. This is a common procedure in neonatal intensive care, and can often be performed until 2 weeks after birth (when the arteries start to decay too much). The umbilical arteries are typically not suitable for infusions.

Additional images

See also
 Single umbilical artery

References

External links
  - "The Female Pelvis: Branches of Internal Iliac Artery"

Arteries of the abdomen
Embryology of cardiovascular system